Karl-Gottfried "Karlfried" Nordmann (22 November 1915 – 22 July 1982) was a German Luftwaffe pilot during World War II and, after the war, a president of Mercedes-Benz in North America. As a fighter ace he was credited with 78 enemy aircraft shot down in over 800 combat missions. He claimed the majority of his victories over the Eastern Front, with one during the Invasion of Poland and eight during the Battle of France and Britain.

Born in Giessen, Nordmann volunteered for military service in the Luftwaffe of the Third Reich in 1936. Following flight training, he was posted to Jagdgeschwader 132 (JG 132—132nd Fighter Wing) in October 1938. After a series of redesignations his unit was subordinated to Jagdgeschwader 51 (JG 51—51st Fighter Wing). He fought in the aerial battles over Poland, France and Britain, claiming nine victories. Following the German invasion of the Soviet Union in Operation Barbarossa, he was appointed Gruppenkommandeur (group commander) of the IV. Gruppe (4th Group) of JG 51. He was awarded the Knight's Cross of the Iron Cross on 1 August 1941 following his 31st aerial victory and received the Knight's Cross of the Iron Cross with Oak Leaves on 16 September 1941 after 59 victories. The Oak Leaves grades to the Knight's Cross was Germany's highest military decoration at the time of its presentation to Nordmann.

Nordmann was appointed Geschwaderkommodore (Wing Commander) of JG 51, which he led for two years, on 10 April 1942. Injuries sustained in a midair collision on 17 January 1943 grounded him from further combat flying. He surrendered command of JG 51 on 1 April 1944 and was appointed Jagdfliegerführer Ostpreussen (fighter leader Eastern Prussia). Nordmann then served further fighter command positions with Jagdabschnittsführer 6 (leader of the 6th fighter sector) and the 1st Fighter Division, a position he held until the end of World War II. Following World War II, Nordmann joined Mercedes-Benz in sales. He worked as the president of Mercedes-Benz in North America and Canada from 1971 until shortly before his death in 1982.

Early life and career
Nordmann was born on 22 November 1915 in Giessen, at the time in the Grand Duchy of Hesse of the German Empire. He was the son of a doctor and joined the military service of the Luftwaffe on 6 April 1936 as a Fahnenjunker (officer cadet). Nordmann was promoted to Leutnant (Second Lieutenant) on 1 January 1938 and served with 1. Staffel of Kampfgeschwader 253 from 1 March to 30 April 1938. He was then posted to the Jagdfliegerschule (Fighter Pilot School) at Werneuchen, under the command of Oberst (Colonel) Theodor Osterkamp. Since July 1938, he served as a Staffeloffizier (squadron officer) with the Stab of I. Gruppe (1st group) of Jagdgeschwader 77 (JG 77—77th Fighter Wing), which later became IV./Jagdgeschwader 51 (JG 51—51st Fighter Wing).

This unit underwent a series of redesignations which started with VI./Jagdgeschwader 132 (JG 132—132nd Fighter Wing), was renamed on 2 November 1938 to I./Jagdgeschwader 331 (JG 331—331st Fighter Wing). While based at Breslau-Schöngarten (currently called Copernicus Airport Wrocław), it was redesignated again, this time to I./JG 77 on 1 May 1939, which was redesignated to IV./JG 51 on 21 November 1940.

World War II
World War II in Europe began on Friday 1 September 1939 when German forces invaded Poland. Nordmann claimed his first aerial victory when he shot down a Polish PZL.43 on 3 September 1939. Nordmann achieved his next victory during the Battle of France and seven more in the Battle of Britain. He was appointed Staffelkapitän (squadron leader) of the 12. Staffel (12th squadron) of Jagdgeschwader 51 (JG 51—51st Fighter Wing) on 1 March 1940, replacing Oberleutnant (First Lieutenant) Erwin Neuerburg who became Staffelkapitän of 7. Staffel of Jagdgeschwader 3 (JG 3—3rd Fighter Wing). In this function, he was promoted to Oberleutnant on 1 April 1940. Nordmann was victorious over two Royal Air Force (RAF) Supermarine Spitfires on 17 October 1940 and achieved his ninth aerial victory on 6 May 1941.

In June 1941, JG 51 and the majority of the Luftwaffe were transferred to the Eastern Front in preparation for Operation Barbarossa, the invasion of the Soviet Union. On 20 July 1941 Nordmann was appointed to command IV./JG 51, succeeding Major Friedrich Beckh who was selected to command JG 51 as Geschwaderkommodore (Wing Commander). Command of the 12. Staffel was passed on to Oberleutnant Heinrich Bär. Less than two weeks later, on 1 August 1941 Nordmann was awarded the Knight's Cross of the Iron Cross after a total of 31 victories which was presented to him by General der Flieger Bruno Loerzer. Unteroffizier (Sergeant) Franz-Josef Beerenbrock flew as Nordmann's Rottenflieger (wing man) around this time. Nordmann achieved his 40th victory in total on 16 August and his 50th on 28 August. Only three weeks later he was awarded the Knight's Cross of the Iron Cross with Oak Leaves on 16 September 1941 after 59 victories which was presented by Adolf Hitler. Three days later, on 19 September, he was promoted to Hauptmann (captain). On 10 April 1942, Nordmann took over command of JG 51 as Geschwaderkommodore from Beckh who was transferred to the Reich Air Ministry.

Nordmann was promoted to Major (major) on 18 June 1942. On 26 June 1942 Nordmann crashed his Messerschmitt Bf 109 F-2 (Werknummer 12825—factory number). The aircraft flipped during the landing and Nordmann suffered a basilar fractured skull, an injury typical of high-speed crashes. Although he flew again shortly after the crash his injury required hospitalization in August. Nordmann, who had been assisted by Hauptmann Joachim Müncheberg as a Geschwaderkommodore in training, temporarily replaced him during his absence. On 17 January 1943 Nordmann's Focke-Wulf Fw 190 was involved in a midair collision with Hauptmann Rudolf Busch, Gruppenkommandeur of I./JG 51. Busch was killed and Nordmann, severely injured, did not fly operationally again. In total, Nordmann claimed 78 aerial victories, 69 of which on the Eastern Front, flying over 800 combat missions. Under his leadership JG 51 reported the 4,000th aerial victory on 16 December 1942, the 5,000th victory on 2 June 1943, the 6,000th victory on 27 July 1943 and the 7,000th victory on 15 September 1943.

Nordmann, who had been promoted to Oberstleutnant (lieutenant colonel) on 1 August 1943, was appointed Jagdfliegerführer Ostpreussen on 1 April 1944. This command was also later referred to as Jagdabschnittsführer 6 (leader of the 6th fighter sector), while subordinated to the Luftflotte 6 (6th Air Fleet). On 11 November, Reichsmarschall (Marshal of the Realm) Hermann Göring, in his role as commander-in-chief of the Luftwaffe, organized a meeting of high-ranking Luftwaffe officers, including Nordmann. The meeting, also referred to as the "Areopag" was held at the Luftkriegsakademie (air war academy) at Berlin-Gatow. This Luftwaffe version of the Greek Areopagus—a court of justice—aimed at finding solutions to the deteriorating air was situation over Germany. He was appointed Inspekteur der Tagjäger Ost (Inspector of Fighter Operations East) on 4 January 1945 and on 30 January 1945 promoted to Oberst (Colonel). Just prior to the end of the war, on 4 April 1945, he took over command of the 1st Fighter Division until the end of the war.

Later life and business career
After World War II, Nordmann joined Mercedes-Benz in 1950, initially working in sales. He later became head of the sales department and, in 1968, head of worldwide services. In January 1971 he was appointed president of Mercedes-Benz in North America and Canada, retiring in January 1981. Despite his retirement, he continued to hold a position as company director. During his tenure with Mercedes, Nordmann was an early mentor of Jürgen Schrempp, who later became the chief executive officer of Daimler AG. Under Nordmann's leadership, Mercedes sales in the United States increased from 30,000 cars in 1970 to 43,600 cars in 1972, a 0.4% U.S. market share. To further expand the market presence in North America, Mercedes in 1976 opened a facility in Jacksonville, Florida. In 1977 Daimler bought the Euclid Company of Ohio and Freightliner Trucks in 1981.

In 1981 Nordmann attended an aviation symposium of the International Order of Characters (IOC) held in Stamford, Connecticut. The symposium panel was made up of four former World War II fighter pilots. In addition to Nordmann, the panel included the former RAF pilots, Sir Douglas Bader and Robert Stanford Tuck, and the former United States Army Air Forces pilot Robert S. Johnson.

He died at his home on 22 July 1982 in Greenwich, Connecticut, USA. Nordmann's wife was named Tina. They had a son, Eric, and a daughter, Corinne.

Summary of career

Aerial victory claims
Nordmann claimed 78 aerial victories, 69 of which on the Eastern Front, achieved in flying over 800 combat missions. Mathews and Foreman, authors of Luftwaffe Aces — Biographies and Victory Claims, researched the German Federal Archives and found records for 75 aerial victory claims, plus two further unconfirmed claims. This number includes 1 claim over Poland, 8 on the Western Front, and 66 on the Eastern Front.

Victory claims were logged to a map-reference (PQ = Planquadrat), for example "PQ 37432". These sectors were then subdivided into 36 smaller units to give a location area 3x4km in size.

Awards
 Iron Cross (1939)
 2nd Class (8 October 1939)
 1st Class (5 January 1940)
 Honour Goblet of the Luftwaffe (Ehrenpokal der Luftwaffe) (28 July 1941)
 Front Flying Clasp of the Luftwaffe for fighter pilots in gold with pennant
 Knight's Cross of the Iron Cross with Oak Leaves
 Knight's Cross on 1 August 1941 as Oberleutnant and Staffelkapitän of the 12./Jagdgeschwader 51
 35th Oak Leaves on 16 September 1941 as Oberleutnant and Staffelkapitän of the 12./Jagdgeschwader 51

Dates of rank

Notes

References

Citations

Bibliography

 
 
 
 
 
 
 
 
 
 
 
 
 
 
 
 
 
 
 

1915 births
1982 deaths
Luftwaffe pilots
German World War II flying aces
People from Giessen
Recipients of the Knight's Cross of the Iron Cross with Oak Leaves
Businesspeople from Hesse
Mercedes-Benz
Military personnel from Hesse